Thompson Campbell (1811 – December 6, 1868) was a U.S. Representative from Illinois.

Life
Born in Ireland, Campbell immigrated to the United States with his parents, who settled in Chester County, Pennsylvania. He attended public schools, studied law, and was admitted to the bar in Pittsburgh, Pennsylvania. He later moved to Galena, Illinois, and engaged in mining.

Campbell served as the Illinois Secretary of State from 1843 until his resignation in 1846. He was a delegate to the state constitutional convention in 1847. He was elected as a Democrat to the 32nd Congress in 1850, and was an unsuccessful candidate for reelection in 1852.

He was a delegate at the 1852 Democratic National Convention and was appointed United States land commissioner for California by President Pierce in 1853 and served until he resigned in 1855. At the 1860 Democratic National Convention, he served as a delegate in Charleston, North Carolina and became an elector at large on the Breckinridge ticket.

During the Civil War, he served in the California State Assembly as a member of the Union Party and was a delegate to the 1864 Republican National Convention.

Death
He died in San Francisco, California on December 6, 1868, and is interred in Laurel Hill Cemetery.

References

External links

1811 births
1868 deaths
American people of Scotch-Irish descent
Secretaries of State of Illinois
Members of the California State Assembly
California Democrats
California Republicans
Democratic Party members of the United States House of Representatives from Illinois
19th-century American politicians
Burials at Laurel Hill Cemetery (San Francisco)